Dagua Airfield, also known as But East, is a former World War II airfield near the village of Dagua in East Sepik Province, Papua New Guinea.

History 
Dagua Airfield was built by the Imperial Japanese Army in February 1943. The airfield was abandoned after the war.

References

Transport in Papua New Guinea
Airports in Papua New Guinea
East Sepik Province